The Man from Oklahoma is a 1926 American silent western film directed by Forrest Sheldon and Harry S. Webb and starring Jack Perrin, Josephine Hill and Lew Meehan. It was distributed by the independent Rayart Pictures, the predecessor of Monogram Pictures.

Synopsis
In a New Mexico town, Lynn Durant is robbed and murdered by Sam Stallings. The Man from Oklahoma arrives in town and eventually discovers Stallings is Durant's killer.

Cast
 Jack Perrin as Man from Oklahoma
 Josephine Hill as 	Rita Lane
 Lew Meehan as 	Sam Stallings
 Lafe McKee as 	Rufus King
 Martin Turner as Mose Jackson
 Edmund Cobb as 	Lynn Durant
 Starlight the Horse as The Oklahoman's Horse 
 Jim Corey as 	Barfly 
 George Hazel as Tall Henchman 
 Molly Malone as Rose 
 Bud Osborne as 	Henchman

References

External links

1926 films
1926 Western (genre) films
1920s American films
Silent American Western (genre) films
Films directed by Harry S. Webb
American silent feature films
1920s English-language films
Rayart Pictures films